The fall of the Derg, also known as Downfall of the Derg, was a military campaign that resulted the defeat of the ruling military junta Derg by the rebel coalition Ethiopian People's Revolutionary Democratic Front (EPRDF) on 28 May 1991 in Addis Ababa, ending the Ethiopian Civil War. The Derg took power after deposing Emperor Haile Selassie and the Solomonic dynasty, an imperial dynasty of Ethiopia that began in 1270. The Derg suffered insurgency with different factions, and separatist rebels groups since early their rule, beginning with the Ethiopian Civil War. The 1983–1985 famine, the Red Terror, and resettlement and villagization infamed the Derg with majority of Ethiopians tended to support insurgent groups like the Tigray People's Liberation Front (TPLF) and Eritrean People's Liberation Front (EPLF).

With the establishment of People's Democratic Republic of Ethiopia in 1987, the Derg government, led by Mengistu Haile Mariam, was subdued by rebel groups due to lack of support from the Soviet Union since 1990.

EPLF account
One account of the Ethiopian People's Liberation Front (EPLF) written in 1980s provides little information about their struggle against the Derg regime, but not as their political ideologies. Dieter Beisel, Reise ins Land der Rebellen, Rowohlt Verlag, Hamburg, 1989, was prominent firsthand journalistic work based on the events surrounding the rebel groups.

Pre-Derg separation movement: 1958–1974

In September 1962, Eritrea was federated with Ethiopia under Emperor Haile Selassie as the ninth province of the Ethiopian Empire after being ruled as Italy's colony and then put under British administration during the Second World War in 1941. As a result, the Eritrean Liberation Movement (ELM) was formed in Sudan in 1958 to fight for independence. Haile Selassie regime became more authoritarian; political parties were persecuted and freedom of speech and press generally suppressed, and native language was banned in favor of Amharic language.

Although Eritrean resistance prevailed throughout the condition with respect to little importance, the movement regarded the turning point in formation of armed separatist groups and movement. Muslim herdsmen lowlander often cemented separatist movement while Christian in the highlands of Eritrea favored to join with Ethiopia. In July 1960, the ELM formed as the Eritrean Liberation Front (ELF) in Cairo by majority Muslims. The number of attack toward the imperial Ethiopian government went from 4 in 1962 to 27 in 1966. The ELF then grew its wing, the Eritrean Liberation Army in early 1967, forcing the Ethiopian government to deploy two brigades into three-phased counterinsurgency operation codenamed Wegaw (lit. "trash").

Early to mid-civil war: 1974–1987

The Provisional Military Administrative Committee, also known as, the Derg seized power following a coup d'état of Emperor Haile Selassie, ending the empire administration and put the country into military dictatorship regime in 1975. Upon neutralizing ELM, in mid-1960s, three factions were reorganize to establish the Eritrean People's Liberation Front (EPLF) in 1974, and the wing Eritrean Liberation Front Army (EPLA). In 1977, the committee elected Mengistu Haile Mariam as the chairman of the Derg while disengaging military posts in Eritrea. The EPLF and ELF launched series offensive in control of most parts of Eritrea other than Asmara, Massawa, Asseb, Barentu, and Senafe. In February 1975, another insurgency group the Tigray People's Liberation Front (TPLF) was formed in response to withdrawal of these areas.

Their first attacked took place in August 1975, and the organization steadily supported by local peasants and the populace as whole.  During early period of formation, the group fought with multidirectional rivalry in lieu of the central government. In 1978, the Derg commenced formal invasion of Ogaden region of Somalia, which claimed the region into integral part of Greater Somalia.      

The EPLF and ELF were successful in seizing 80% of Eritrea, but the Derg as soon as diverted their attention to Eritrea after victory against Somalia, fearing the loss of Red Sea in isolation of Ethiopia. In early 1978, they organized 90,000 powerful Second Revolutionary Army (SRA) and launched multi-sided attacks against EPLF and ELF. The Derg achieved control of southern and central Eritrea since June 1978 operation, and resumed offensives in November 1978 to capture Agordat, Afabet and Keren.

The Derg secured road connecting Massawa with Asmara, but heavily assaulted while besieging fortification of EPLA by June 1983. Although the government made significant investment to infrastructure-rehabilitation projects and villagization of rural population by early 1980s, the Red Terror, and 1983–1985 famine disesteemed the Derg unpopularly, especially from the whole population, and conversely, the opponent rebel groups gained broad support. The Derg also accused relief organizations for the famine for assisting the insurgent groups. By the 1984, the TPLF controlled most of rural area of Tigray, while Adigrat and Shire were de facto under siege. Situation were capsized when EPLF ceased support to TPLF by blockade of route with Sudan in 1985. The Derg advanced its military to Eritrea, and the Tigrayan insurgency were emboldened for potential threat.

The EPLF took strategic entrance after year breakup of operations Stealth Offensive and Red Star campaign in June 1982, and retook Teseney, and Aligider,  thus captured land connection between Sahel Redoubt and Sudan in January 1984. Subsequently, they retook military outpost of Ethiopia in Alghena area, on the coast of Red Sea a week later. By May 1986, the Asmara–Massawa road destroyed, with air bases and artillery was burned by the insurgent.

From People's Democratic Republic to fall of Addis Ababa: 1987–1991

In September 1987, Mengistu proclaimed Ethiopia as a socialist republic officially named "People's Democratic Republic of Ethiopia", and the Derg became Ethiopian Worker's Party. The same year, the Amhara anti-government opposition groups known as the Ethiopian People's Democratic Movement (EPDM) was formed. Together with TPLF, they established coalition known as the Ethiopian People's Revolutionary Democratic Front (EPDRF) in 1989, with Meles Zenawi serving a chairman of both the TPLF and EPDM. Mengistu banned the Ethiopian media from using the term glasnost and perestroika, defying Mikhail Gorbachev who was believed has not fondness for him. Gorbachev sent communist conservatives with military men in Moscow to aid with the rate of 1 billion dollars in the next three consecutive years.

20,000 Soviet troops were surrendered to EPLF when they attempt infiltrating Afabet, which shocked Gorbachev to turn the decision. He ultimately told to Mengistu that he would do not have opportunity to deal equipments and ceasing by 1990.  By the end of decade, the insurgents acceded the importance of mixed economy, multi-party democracy, and open society over socialist dogma in order to aid defeating the Derg. These ideologues would concur with close the United States allies. In early February 1990, EPLF successful controlled Massawa, de-linking the road of Mengistu's army in Asmara and central Eritrea. In early 1990, Mengistu provided emigration of Ethiopian Jews to Israel. The Israeli lobbying campaign peaked on behalf of Mengistu with the February's visit to Israeli foreign minister official to Washington. Many Jewish organizations and leaders even from US Congress discerned Mengistu's task in the lobbying effort.

On 5 March 1990, Mengistu delivered lengthy speech to address threats in the country and beseeching reforms. From 17 to 21 January 1991, the EPRDF held its first congress in Tigray, which was published on 10 March containing backward old fashioned Marxist rhetoric: advocating "People's Republic" dominated by "workers and peasants" in repudiation of "capitalists with foreign sponsorships" as well as "feudals". Meles concerned about cooperation with the Oromo Liberation Front about future of Ethiopia, which had almost odd coordinations including harassing settlers, abduction relief workers and the Derg outposts. At the end of January 1991, the EPRDF launched campaign to liberate Amhara region codenamed "Operation Tewedros". In early March 1991, the Afar Liberation Front became an ally of EPRDF without formal joining. In the same month, they captured Bahir Dar, through Gojjam and Blue Nile, crossing Wollo province via capital Dessie. By this time, the Derg had opted to resistance.

They paved to Shewa and Welega to Addis Ababa; in April, they took Oromia dominated territory capital of Wolega, Nekemte, and moved to Gimbi, by which OLF and EPRDF gained mutual harmony. On 27 May, they had almost controlled the southwest cities such as Jimma, Agaro and Gambela, amid London conference. The Derg authority were immediately fell in disorder, evacuated from the area. On 28 May, the EPRDF took control of Addis Ababa; Mengistu and some other the Derg officials fled the country, or arrested. Mengistu fled to Zimbabwe, where he still lives.

References

Derg
Addis Ababa
Decommunization
Ethiopian Civil War
Revolutions of 1989
Wars involving Ethiopia